José Carlos Bizama Venegas (born 25 June 1994) is a Chilean professional footballer who plays as a defender for Palestino and the Chile national team.

Club career

Huachipato 
Born in Curanilahue, Bizama began his career with Chilean Primera División club Huachipato; joining Los Acereros when he was 16. He made his professional debut on 22 May 2014, coming on as a sub in a 5–4 win over Deportes Concepción in a Copa Chile match. Bizama made his Primera División debut on 8 August 2014 in a 2–1 against Deportes Iquique. He made his first appearance in an international competition on 12 August 2015 when he got the start in a 2–0 defeat to Club Olimpia in the Copa Sudamericana.  Bizama scored his first professional goal on 16 January 2016 in a 3–0 win over C.D. Universidad de Concepción.

Houston Dynamo 
On 11 July 2019, Bizama signed with Major League Soccer club Houston Dynamo. However, Bizama wasn't officially added to the roster or allowed to train with the team until 2 August due to issues obtaining a visa. He made his Dynamo debut on 11 August, getting the start in a 2–1 defeat to the Philadelphia Union. Bizama would go on to make 5 appearances, 4 of them starts, in his first season with Houston.

On 28 February 2020, Bizama suffered a broken leg in practice the day before the Dynamo season opener.  He underwent surgery on 2 March.  He made his first appearance of the season on 9 September, playing the full match in a 1–1 draw at the Colorado Rapids.  Bizama would go on to appear in 8 games in a shortened season due to the COVID-19 pandemic as Houston finished bottom of the Western Conference, missing out on the playoffs again.

On 15 May, Bizama made his first appearance of the 2021 season, playing the full 90 minutes in a 3–1 loss to the Rapids.  That would be his only appearance of the season for the Dynamo.

On 5 August 2021, Bizama joined USL Championship side Charlotte Independence on loan for the remainder of the season.  He made his Independence debut on 8 September, playing 90 minutes in a 5–0 win over Loudoun United.  Bizama made 9 regular season appearances for the Independence, helping Charlotte finish 2nd in the Atlantic Division and qualify for the playoffs.  He came off the bench in both of Charlotte's playoff games as they reached the conference semifinals, where they lost 1–0 to Louisville City.

Following the 2021 season, Bizama's contract option was declined by Houston. In January 2022 he signed for Palestino.

International career 
On 17 May 2018, Bizama was called up by Reinaldo Rueda to the Chile national team for 3 friendlies. Bizama would make his debut on 31 May, coming on as a sub in a 3–2 loss to Romania. He would also make 2 more appearances 4 and 8 June, coming on as a sub against Serbia and Poland, respectively. On 28 August 2019, Bizama was called back into the national squad by Rueda for two friendlies. He would come on as a sub in a 2–1 loss to Honduras to earn his 4th cap for La Roja.

Playing style
He is nicknamed "La Flecha" ("The Arrow") due to his speed.

Career statistics

Club statistics

International statistics

References

1994 births
Living people
People from Arauco Province
Chilean footballers
Chilean expatriate footballers
Chile international footballers
C.D. Huachipato footballers
Houston Dynamo FC players
Charlotte Independence players
Club Deportivo Palestino footballers
Chilean Primera División players
Major League Soccer players
USL Championship players
Chilean expatriate sportspeople in the United States
Expatriate soccer players in the United States
Association football defenders